Nicolae Sinescu was one of the generals of the Romanian Land Forces in the First World War. He served as a cavalry division commander in the 1916 and 1917 campaigns.

Biography
After graduating from the military school of officers with the rank of lieutenant, Nicolae Sinescu held various positions in the cavalry units or in the upper echelons of the army, the most important being the commander of the 5th Red Brigade and Inspector General of the Cavalry.

During the First World War, he served as: commander of the 2nd Cavalry Division, between November 29, 1916, to January 15, 1917, and commander of the Cavalry Corps between July 2, 1917, to December 1917.

References

Bibliography
 Kiritescu, Constantin,  History of the war for the unification of Romania, Scientific and Encyclopedic Publishing House, Bucharest, 1989
 Ioanițiu Alexandru (Lt.-Colonel),  The Romanian War: 1916-1918, vol 1, Genius Printing House, Bucharest, 1929
 Romania in the World War 1916-1919, Documents, Annexes, Volume 1, Official Gazette and State Printing Offices, Bucharest, 1934
 The General Headquarters of the Romanian Army. Documents 1916 - 1920, Machiavelli Publishing House, Bucharest, 1996
 Military history of the Romanian people, vol. V, Military Publishing House, Bucharest, 1989
 Romania in the years of the First World War, Militară Publishing House, Bucharest, 1987
 "Romania in the First World War", Military Publishing House, 1979

1861 births
1934 deaths
Romanian Land Forces generals
Romanian Army World War I generals
Romanian military personnel of the Second Balkan War